On October 13, 2021, a passenger was sexually assaulted by another rider on a train running on SEPTA's Market–Frankford Line in Philadelphia, Pennsylvania. This incident gained international attention due to the lack of calls to authorities despite several bystanders around the area, allowing the assault to carry on for over 30 minutes until an off-duty SEPTA employee reported the incident, resulting in SEPTA's swift arrest of the suspect.

Incident

At around 9:20 PM, 35-year-old Fiston M. Ngoy (born August 8, 1986), an often-homeless individual and a resident from Philadelphia, began sexually harassing a woman sitting next to him on a Market–Frankford Line train. This continued for about 30 minutes, with the woman repeatedly pushing Ngoy off her until he ripped her pants down at 9:53 PM and raped her for 6 minutes. According to SEPTA surveillance video, there were several bystanders witnessing the incident, even holding up their cellphones during the assault, and failing to alert authorities or stop the assault until one off-duty employee called 911 after boarding the train and noticing "something wasn't right". 

After the initial 911 call, a SEPTA security officer boarded the train when it arrived at the 69th Street Transportation Center, arresting Ngoy for the assault after pulling him off the victim. According to SEPTA general manager Leslie Richards, the arrest occurred 3 minutes after the initial 911 call. Investigators were able to charge Ngoy with rape, sexual assault and aggravated indecent assault without consent after viewing the video recording, holding him at the Delaware County Jail with bail set at $180,000.

During Ngoy's initial court proceedings in November, he claimed it was a consensual act, but the victim stated that was not the case and that she had been drinking before boarding the train. She testified in court that she had repeatedly attempted to push Ngoy off her until she "blacked out".

Reactions

Responses by authorities

SEPTA and the Upper Darby Police Department condemned the attack and criticized passengers for their delayed action. SEPTA spokesperson Andrew Busch released a statement, saying "There were other people on the train who witnessed this horrific act, and it may have been stopped sooner if a rider called 911."

In response to allegations that passengers holding up their phones were videorecording the assault, Delaware County District Attorney Jack Stollsteimer refuted the claim, countering that many of the bystanders may not have understood what they were seeing. Stollsteimer also stated that the bystanders would not face prosecution charges, as Pennsylvania does not allow for prosecution of witnesses to a crime, urging them to come forward with information about the case.

Scholarly analysis
Several scholars and social workers cited this incident as an example of the bystander effect, with social worker Kelly Erickson offering that witnesses did not "know what to do, and they're maybe afraid that they'll make things worse by intervening. Roy Peter Clark of the Poynter Institute compared the SEPTA incident to the Murder of Kitty Genovese, which also saw the press push an overly sensationalized narrative. He opined that in the SEPTA case, the narrative painted the surrounding passengers in a bad light, which may have been magnified by inclement weather as well as the COVID-19 pandemic and its effect on the economy and society. University of Miami criminologist Alexis Piquero offered several possible explanations of why witnesses failed to intervene, including assuming someone else would step in or fear of retaliation from the perpetrator.  

Elizabeth Jeglic, a psychology professor at the John Jay College of Criminal Justice, stated that the 2021 SEPTA train incident may have been an aberration, claiming that according to modern research on video surveillance, people intervened during 90% of extreme cases. She also stated that bystanders would usually act when a crime was more apparent, which may not have been the case. Jeglic dismissed the notion of the bystander effect and noted that one of the two passengers who recorded the incident on video provided that video to authorities in an attempt to aid the investigation. Jenice Armstrong, a journalist with The Philadelphia Inquirer, argued that passengers may have done more to intervene than what was reported by SEPTA and the police, interviewing Tom Schiliro, one of the officers who apprehended Ngoy. Schiliro told Armstrong that some passengers pointed him to the suspect as soon as the train's doors opened.

See also 

 Bystander effect

References

October 2021 crimes in the United States
2021 in Philadelphia
Rapes in the United States
Sexual assaults in the United States
Crimes in Philadelphia
SEPTA